Mevlana Mosque may refer to:
 Mevlana Rumi Mosque, Edmonton, London, United Kingdom
 Mevlana Mosque, Rotterdam, Netherlands